Elections to Limavady Borough Council were held on 30 May 1973 on the same day as the other Northern Irish local government elections. The election used three district electoral areas to elect a total of 15 councillors.

Election results

Districts summary

|- class="unsortable" align="centre"
!rowspan=2 align="left"|Ward
! % 
!Cllrs
! % 
!Cllrs
! %
!Cllrs
!rowspan=2|TotalCllrs
|- class="unsortable" align="center"
!colspan=2 bgcolor="" | SDLP
!colspan=2 bgcolor="" | Alliance
!colspan=2 bgcolor="white"| Others
|-
|align="left"|Area A
|37.5
|2
|14.3
|1
|bgcolor="#0077FF"|48.2
|bgcolor="#0077FF"|3
|6
|-
|align="left"|Area B
|32.8
|2
|1.7
|0
|bgcolor="#0077FF"|65.5
|bgcolor="#0077FF"|3
|5
|-
|align="left"|Area C
|18.1
|0
|17.8
|1
|bgcolor="#0077FF"|64.1
|bgcolor="#0077FF"|3
|4
|-
|- class="unsortable" class="sortbottom" style="background:#C9C9C9"
|align="left"| Total
|30.0
|4
|11.2
|2
|58.8
|9
|15
|-
|}

Districts results

Area A

1973: 3 x United Unionist, 2 x SDLP, 1 x Alliance

Area B

1973: 2 x United Unionist, 2 x SDLP, 1 x Independent

Area C

1973: 3 x United Unionist, 1 x Alliance

References

Limavady Borough Council elections
Limavady